Sulphur Glacier is located in Shoshone National Forest, in the U.S. state of Wyoming on the east of the Sunlight Peak in the Absaroka Range. Sulphur Glacier is also within the North Absaroka Wilderness.

References

See also
 List of glaciers in the United States

Glaciers of Park County, Wyoming
Shoshone National Forest
Glaciers of Wyoming